David Erler (born 1981) is a German countertenor, a male classical singer in the alto vocal range, specialising in Baroque music.

Career 

Erler was born in Auerbach (Vogtland). He attended the musical gymnasium Clara-Wieck-Gymnasium in Zwickau, and studied at the Musikhochschule Leipzig with Maria Jonas and mainly Marek Rzepka, on a scholarship of the Hanns Seidel Foundation. He took masterclasses with Andreas Scholl, Marius van Altena and The King’s Singers. He graduated in 2006.

In the field of historically informed performance, Erler has collaborated as a soloist with conductors such as Manfred Cordes, Laurence Cummings, Philippe Herreweghe, Jos van Immerseel, Wolfgang Katschner, Rudolf Lutz, Hermann Max, Gregor Meyer, Peter Neumann, Hans-Christoph Rademann, Ludger Rémy, Gotthold Schwarz, Jos van Veldhoven, Adam Viktora and Roland Wilson. He has appeared as a guest singer with vocal ensembles amarcord, Calmus Ensemble, Singer Pur, Singphoniker and Stimmwerck.

He is the chief editor of Johann Kuhnau's complete vocal works with Breitkopf & Härtel. He also published Jan Dismas Zelenka's Requiem (ZWV 46) with the same publishing company.

References

External links
 
 
 

Living people

German countertenors
German performers of early music
1981 births
21st-century German male singers